"Sugar, We're Goin Down" is a song by American rock band Fall Out Boy, released to US radio on April 4, 2005 as the lead single from their second album, From Under the Cork Tree. Two different CD singles were released with different B-sides, Part I with a green cover and Part II with a red cover. With music composed by vocalist Patrick Stump and lyrics penned by bassist Pete Wentz, the single reached  8 on the US Billboard Hot 100, becoming Fall Out Boy's first top-10 hit and exploding the band into the mainstream, exposing them to a new audience. It spent five weeks in the top 10 and 20 weeks in the top 20 out of its 42 chart weeks.

The song became the band's first two-million seller in July 2009, and as of February 2013, has sold 4,639,000 copies in the US. It was upgraded to a 4× platinum certification by the Recording Industry Association of America (RIAA) in February 2015. On July 22, 2013, "Sugar, We're Goin Down" was certified silver by the British Phonographic Industry (BPI) for 200,000 sales.

Background
Stump told Rolling Stone that he deliberately slurred the lyrics in the song's chorus to make it sound better, saying that he "was trying to do a straight punk song for fun" and adding, "I saw those lyrics and just kind of barked them out. But there was something about the rhythm of it, where I was like, 'Hmm, that actually might be too good for just a shitty punk song.'" During the writing of the song it went through thirty changes and then went back to the way it first started.

The song appears on the karaoke games Lips (as downloadable content) and in Karaoke Revolution Presents: American Idol, and is also a playable song on Band Hero. It is in the 2005 film The Fog and its soundtrack. American country pop artist Taylor Swift covered "Sugar, We're Goin Down" at a concert on her 2011 Speak Now Tour in Chicago, during which she would sing a cover of a song originally released by an artist from each tour stop. Hayley Williams joined Fall Out Boy onstage in 2014 to perform the song as part of a Super Bowl Blitz show. The band themselves used a sample of the song in "What a Catch, Donnie" and referenced it in "Save Rock and Roll", from the album of the same title.

Chart performance
"Sugar, We're Goin Down" would rise and fall in inconsistent patterns. The song debuted on the Billboard Hot 100 on July 2, 2005, at No. 93 and rose each week. Eleven weeks later, on September 17, 2005, the song entered the top 10 at its peak of No. 8, becoming Fall Out Boy's first top 10 single. At this point, the song did not have much airplay but had relied on the strength of digital downloads alone, and it experienced a sales surge following the band's performance at the 2005 MTV Video Music Awards.

Following this download surge, however, downloads fell, and the song dropped to No. 15 the following week. During this time, though, mainstream radio support came in, and while downloads were falling, airplay was able to help stabilize the song. As a result, "Sugar" rose in the following weeks to be at either position No. 10 or 11. It spent five weeks in the top 10 and 20 weeks in the top 20, and in total stayed on the charts for 42 weeks before it was retired, making it the band's most successful single charting. The track peaked at No. 2 on the Hot Digital Songs chart and reached the top position on the Hot Digital Tracks chart. Its airplay peak was No. 18 on the Hot 100 Airplay chart.

On the Pop 100 chart, "Sugar, We're Goin Down" displayed a slightly better performance. With the same digital download stats, but with an airplay panel to its advantage, the song reached a peak position of No. 6 on the Pop 100 with its component airplay, Pop 100 Airplay, being No. 6. In terms of total spins versus total impressions, the single also peaked at No. 6 on the Top 40 Mainstream chart. It reached No. 3 on the Hot Modern Rock Tracks chart and became a rock-radio staple.

In the United Kingdom, the song first charted on January 15, 2006, at No. 54 before moving to just outside the top 20 at No. 24 on February 5. However, it continued rising in the charts in February, and entered the top 10 at its peak position of No. 8. As of 2013, the song has sold over 200,000 copies in the UK to date being certified silver. It remained in the top 75 of the UK Singles Chart for 21 weeks.

Music video
The official music video for "Sugar, We're Goin Down" was directed by Matt Lenski. The music video starts with a man who has deer's antlers embedded into his head. When walking around, a boy threw a shirt at one of his anthers. While eating at a cemetery, a kite falls down on his antlers and a girl tries to recover it. The girl then meets the man and they both become friends. The girl's father wasn't happy with his daughter in a relationship with a man who has deer's antlers and asks him to leave his daughter alone. Frustrated, he decides to try to cut his anthers with a variety of weapons but was stopped by the girl. Later, the couple then went to a bowling alley. When the daughter's father notices about his daughter being with the man again, he decides to try to shoot down the man with an bow and arrow but fails as a car rams onto him. The man then tries to help him but noticed his legs having the deer's legs. The father then lets his daughter to be with the man. The music video also frequently cuts to scenes of the band members performing the song.

Reception and legacy
Blender ranked "Sugar, We're Goin Down" at No. 4 on their "100 Greatest Songs of 2005" list and About.com placed the song at No. 3 on their "Top 100 Pop Songs of 2005" list. It was also nominated for the Kerrang! Award for Best Single in 2006. In 2009, Phoenix New Times writer Martin Cizmar wrote that "Sugar, We're Goin Down" was possibly "the most listened-to emo track of all time".

In 2015, Billboard ranked the song number six on their list of the 10 greatest Fall Out Boy songs, and in 2021, Kerrang ranked the song number four on their list of the 20 greatest Fall Out Boy songs. In 2020, Alternative Press called "Sugar, We're Goin' Down" one of the most influential pop punk songs of all time, stating that the song "shaped the genre," was "a lyrically abstract masterpiece that gave subsequent bands an excuse to write creatively" and that it was "a game-changer." In 2021, Rolling Stone ranked "Sugar, We're Goin Down" at 443 on their amended list of the "500 Greatest Songs of All Time." Variety ranked it as one of the best emo songs of all time in 2022.

Track listings
All songs were written by Fall Out Boy.

CD single
 "Sugar, We're Goin Down" – 3:51
 "The Music or the Misery" – 3:27

CD 1
 "Sugar, We're Goin Down" – 3:47
 "The Music or the Misery" – 3:27

CD 2
 "Sugar, We're Goin Down" (album version)
 "Dance, Dance" (Patrick Stump Secret Agent Remix)
 "Snitches and Talkers Get Stitches and Walkers"
 "Sugar, We're Goin Down" (video)

7-inch vinyl
 "Sugar, We're Goin Down"
 "Nobody Puts Baby in the Corner" (Acoustic version)

Charts

Weekly charts

Year-end charts

Certifications

Release history

References

2004 songs
2005 singles
Fall Out Boy songs
Island Records singles
Mercury Records singles
Music videos directed by Matt Lenski
Songs written by Patrick Stump
Songs written by Pete Wentz
Song recordings produced by Neal Avron
Emo songs
Songs written by Andy Hurley
Songs written by Joe Trohman